Mírame (English: "Look at me") may refer to:

Mírame, 2007 album by Marbella Corella
Mírame, 1987 album by María Conchita Alonso
Mírame, 2001 album by Manuel Landeta
"Mírame", 2005 song by Belanova from the album Dulce Beat
"Mírame", 2005 song by Daddy Yankee and Deevani from the album Mas Flow 2
"Mírame", 2007 song by Jenni Rivera from the album Mi Vida Loca
"Mírame", 2006 song by Mary Ann Avecedo from the album Mary Ann
"Mírame", 2006 song by Nikki Clan
"Mírame", 2009 song by Víctor Manuelle
"Mírame (Cuestión de Tiempo)", 1987 song by Timbiriche from the album Timbiriche VII